Bishop's Mitre is a mountain located  east of Brave Mountain on the northern coast of Labrador in the Kaumajet Mountains. Noteworthy for the river carved down its middle, its appearance is like a steep tower, which lies on the north point of Grimmington Island, between Seal Bight and Cod Bag Harbour.

References

Labrador
Bishop's Mitre